is a 1971 Japanese war film directed by Kihachi Okamoto from a screenplay by Kaneto Shindo and Ryōzō Kasahara, with effects by Teruyoshi Nakano.

Release
Battle of Okinawa received a roadshow theatrical release released on 17 July 1971 in Japan. It received a general release in Japan on 14 August 1971. The film was Toho's highest-grossing film of the year, and the fourth highest grossing domestic release of the year in Japan.

The film was released theatrically in the United States by Min-On of America with a 149-minute running time on 11 September 1973.

Cast

See also
List of Japanese films of 1971

References

Sources

External links

1971 films
Okinawa (film)
Japanese epic films
Films directed by Kihachi Okamoto
Films scored by Masaru Sato
Films produced by Sanezumi Fujimoto
Films with screenplays by Kaneto Shindo
Pacific War films
Films set in Okinawa Prefecture
1971 war films
Japanese World War II films
1970s Japanese films